Order No. 027 is a 1986 North Korean propaganda action drama film directed by Jung Ki-mo and Kim Eung-suk.

Cast
 Kim Jung-woon (김정운) as Chul-woo (철우)
 Cha Sung-chul (차성철) as Kil-nam (길남)
 Kim Ha-choon (김하춘) as Woo-jae (우재)
 Ri Won-bok (리원복) as Young-geun (영근)
 Kim Hye-sun (김혜선) as Eun-ha (은하)
 Choi Young-chul (최영철) as Chang-hyun (창현)
 Han Bong-ho (한봉호) as Bong-nam (봉남)
 Cho Kwang (조광) as Chun-soo (천수)
 Park Geun-sang (박근상) as Jung-gyu (정규)
 Kim Kwang-moon (김광문) as Chief of Reconnaissance
 Jeon Ryong-joo (전룡주) as Jang Young-dal (장영달)
 Yoon Chan (윤찬)
 Choi Yang (최양)
 Ri Kwang-yong (리광용)
 Ri Hoon (리훈)
 Choi Ho-il (최호일)
 Kim Myung-ho (김명호)
 Shin Je-kook (신제국)

References

External links
 

North Korean drama films
1980s Korean-language films
Films about the Korean People's Army
Korean War films